Muaro Jambi might refer to:
 Muaro Jambi Regency, a regency in Jambi province, Sumatra, Indonesia
 Muaro Jambi Temple Compounds, an archaeological site consisting of several Buddhist temples